Malcolm Lees Taylor (16 July 1904 – 14 March 1978) was an English cricketer active from 1924 to 1931 who played for Lancashire. He was born in Heywood, Lancashire and died in Wimborne Minster. He appeared in 96 first-class matches as a lefthanded batsman, scoring 2,216 runs with a highest score of 107* and held 42 catches.

Notes

1904 births
1978 deaths
English cricketers
Lancashire cricketers
Dorset cricketers
Minor Counties cricketers